The Apostasy is the eighth studio album by Polish extreme metal band Behemoth. The album was released on 17 July 2007 through Regain Records.

Background
The Apostasy was recorded at the Radio Gdańsk Studios from November 2006 till March 2007. The record was then mixed by Daniel Bergstrand in the Dug Out Studio in Uppsala, Sweden in March 2007. Then it was mastered by Bjorn Engelmann in the Cutting Room Studios in Stockholm, Sweden also in March 2007.

Unlike Behemoth's previous studio albums, a piano and a horn section (a trio of trumpet, trombone, French horn) were used in several of the album's songs. During the recording sessions, the band re-recorded a new version of "Chant for Eschaton 2000" – originally released on their album Satanica – which was released on the band's 2008 EP, Ezkaton. The Apostasy is Behemoth's first album to chart on the Billboard 200, having debuted at #149. The album was also put out in vinyl format limited to 500 copies.

The album title refers to "apostasy", the state of having forsaken one's professed belief set, often in favour of opposing beliefs or causes. The album cover artwork is a depiction of the Hindu goddess Kali.

Track listing

Explanation of song titles 
 "Rome 64 C.E." – the Great Fire of Rome occurred in 64 C.E., in which Peter from the bible (and possible other apostles as well), were allegedly killed. This explains the name of the song "Slaying the Prophets ov Isa".
 "Slaying the Prophets ov Isa" – Isa is the Arabic name for Jesus.
 "Prometherion" is a portmanteau of Prometheus ("forethought") and Therion ("wild animal" or "beast").
 "At the Left Hand ov God" is referring to the left-hand path 
 "Kriegsphilosophie" is German for "philosophy of war".
 "Pazuzu" – the Pazuzu was a much-feared creature of legend in Mesopotamian mythology, with a deformed head, wings of an eagle, sharp claws of a lion on its feet, and tail of a scorpion. It is the personification of the south-east storm wind, which brings diseases.
 "Christgrinding Avenue" talks about the Via Dolorosa and the crucifixion of Jesus.

Personnel 

 Behemoth
 Adam "Nergal" Darski – rhythm, lead and acoustic guitars, vocals, choir arrangements
 Zbigniew Robert "Inferno" Promiński – drums and percussion
 Tomasz "Orion" Wróblewski – bass guitar, additional vocals

 Additional musicians
 Patryk Dominik "Seth" Sztyber – rhythm and lead guitars, additional backing vocals 
 Leszek Możdżer – piano on Inner Sanctum
 Warrel Dane (Nevermore) – vocals on Inner Sanctum
 Piotr Głuch (Manthu) – trumpet, trumpet arrangements
 Jacek Swedrzynski (Kyrios) – French horn
 Marcin Dziecielewski (Majestic) – trombone
 Hanna Kwiatkowska (Cappella Gedanensis) – soprano
 Anna Asmus (Cappella Gedanensis) – soprano
 Sylwia Falecka (Cappella Gedanensis) – alto
 Tamara Hejka–Grom (Cappella Gedanensis) – alto
 Piotr Macalak (Cappella Gedanensis) – basso
 Franciszek Iskrzycki (Academic Choir of the University of Gdansk) – tenor
 Grzegorz Zieba (Academic Choir of the University of Gdansk) – tenor

 Production
 Krzysztof Azarewicz – incantations, spells
 Kuba Mankowski (Pnemua) – choral arrangements
 Piotr Banka – trumpet arrangements
 Arkadiusz "Malta" Malczewski – sound engineering, co–production
 Marcin Malinowski – assistant engineer
 Daniel Bergstrand – mixing
 Bjorn Engelmann – mastering
 Tomasz "Graal" Danilowicz – cover concept, design and artwork, mask design
 Krzysztof "Sado" Sadowski – band photography
 Zbigniew Jozwik – mask sculpture
 Sharon E. Wennekers – grammatical consultations
 Note
Recorded at RG Studios November 2006 - March 2007. 
Mixed in Dug Out Studio, Uppsala, March 2007. 
Mastered in Cutting Room Studio, Stockholm, March 2007. 
Samples on track IX recorded in Ilaga Sophia, Turkey, 2006. 
Samples on track X recorded in Swayambunath Stupa, Kathmandu, Nepal, 2005.

Charts

Release history

References 

2007 albums
Behemoth (band) albums
Century Media Records albums
Regain Records albums
Mystic Production albums
Albums produced by Adam Darski